Admiral Frederick Beauchamp Paget Seymour, 1st Baron Alcester,  (12 April 1821 – 30 March 1895) was a British naval commander. He was Commander-in-Chief of the Channel Fleet between 1874 and 1877 and of the Mediterranean Fleet between 1880 and 1883.

Background
Seymour was the son of Colonel Sir Horace Seymour and a cousin of the 5th Marquess of Hertford. 
He was a great-grandson of the 1st Marquess of Hertford.

Naval career
Seymour entered the Royal Navy in 1834, and served in the Mediterranean and the Pacific, and was for three years aide-de-camp to his uncle Sir George Seymour, and was promoted to commander in 1847. He also served in Burma. He was the Commander-in-Chief of the Australia Station from 10 March 1860 and 21 July 1862 as Commodore second class with his pennant aboard . He commanded the Naval Brigade in New Zealand during the New Zealand Wars of 1860–61, and was made a Companion of the Order of the Bath (CB) for this.

From 1868 to 1870 Seymour served as private secretary to the First Lord of the Admiralty, Hugh Childers, and was promoted to Rear-Admiral. From 1870 to 1872 he commanded the flying squadron. In 1872, he became a Fourth Naval Lord for two years, and then commander of the Channel Fleet. He became a vice-admiral on 31 December 1876, and was appointed KCB in June 1877, and was promoted to GCB on 24 May 1881. From 1880 to 1883 he was Commander-in-Chief, Mediterranean Fleet, and from 1883 to 1885 he was Second Naval Lord. He became an admiral in May 1882.

He was created Baron Alcester (pronounced "Allster"), of Alcester in the County of Warwick, on 24 November 1882 for his command of the bombardment of Alexandria and in the subsequent operations on the coast of Egypt. He was also honoured with a parliamentary grant of £25,000, the Freedom of the City of London and a Sword of Honour.

Personal life
Lord Alcester never married. He died 30 March 1895, aged 73, when his peerage became extinct.

In his will he left the balance of his estate to Agnes Sinclair for her lifetime.  On her death, two fifths were left to Frederick Charles Horace Sinclair and one fifth each to Hugh Francis Paget Sinclair, Claude Sinclair and Evelyn Sinclair.

See also

References

Attribution

External links
 

1821 births
1895 deaths
Royal Navy admirals
Royal Navy personnel of the Anglo-Egyptian War
Royal Navy personnel of the New Zealand Wars
Military leaders of the New Zealand Wars
Barons in the Peerage of the United Kingdom
Military personnel from London
Knights Grand Cross of the Order of the Bath
Lords of the Admiralty
Beauchamp Seymour, 1st Baron Alcester
Peers of the United Kingdom created by Queen Victoria